Ian Lowe (born 29 August 2002) is a Bahamian footballer who plays for the Olivet Nazarene Tigers and the Bahamian national football team.

Youth and college career
Lowe began playing for Lyford Cay FC at age 11. Three years later, he made a position change to goalkeeper. Following the 2016/17 Bahamas U15 Division season, Lowe joined Dynamos FC and posted fifteen shutouts during his first season with the club.

In June 2021 it was announced that Lowe would be playing college soccer in the United States for the Tigers of Olivet Nazarene University beginning with the 2021/22 season.

International career
Lowe was called up to the national team for the first time in September 2018 for CONCACAF Nations League qualifying. Lowe made his senior debut for the Bahamas on 7 September 2018, registering eleven minutes off the bench in a 4–0 defeat to Belize in CONCACAF Nations League qualifying. He was called up once again, this time for a match against Anguilla, in November 2018.

International statistics

References

External links

ONU profile
NAIA profile

2002 births
Living people
Bahamian footballers
Bahamas international footballers
Association football goalkeepers